Steven DePaul is an American television director and producer. He has directed multiple episodes of "The Good Doctor", "The Gifted", Shades of Blue, NCIS-LA, CSI-NY, GRIMM, The Unit, Bones, as well as many episodes of one-hour dramatic television (updated list IMDB). He was a longstanding producer and director on NYPD Blue. In his capacity as producer of NYPD Blue he won the Emmy Award for Outstanding Drama Series in 1995. He was also nominated for NYPD Blue on five other occasions (in 1994, 1996, 1997, 1998 and 1999). Also wonGolden Globe Award for Best Television Series – Drama in 1993, and a George F. Peabody for "Raging Bulls" (Season 6, episode 8), an episode he directed for NYPD Blue.

DePaul was born in Washington Heights, NY. He is the son of Michael DePaola, (SSGT World War II in North Africa and Italy. Purple heart, BSM) who was a union organizer (District 65) and a bartender. His mother, Hermione (Billie), was a school teacher and librarian. Brother of David DePaul (1948-1969). Steven enrolled at Clark University, where he majored in English graduating in Dec. 1972. He was involved in booking artists to play concerts on campus and at the Clark Coffeehouse.  Upon graduation, DePaul began working on Rock & Roll tours, first working as a roadie for Poco ('73-74). He spent the next 15 years touring with bands including Joni Mitchell, The Eagles, The Grateful Dead, Dan Fogelberg, Crosby, Stills and Nash, Boston, The Cars and The Faces. This career ended with a long stint, ('84-'92) with Bruce Springsteen and the E Street Band, including the "Born in the USA" tour and the worldwide Amnesty International "Human Rights Now!" tour. DePaul then moved to Los Angeles to work for producer Steven Bochco on shows including Cop Rock, Civil Wars and NYPD Blue. He worked on NYPD Blue for 11 years, during which he directed multiple episodes. In 2004, he left NYPD Blue and became a freelance director, the position he currently holds. He has travelled extensively on six continents.

Filmography

Producer

Director

References

https://web.archive.org/web/20100610161232/http://www.peabody.uga.edu/winners/winners_book.php

http://articles.latimes.com/1995-07-21/entertainment/ca-26201_1_emmy-award-nominations

External links

American television directors
Television producers from New York City
Clark University alumni
Living people
People from Washington Heights, Manhattan
1952 births
Film directors from New York City